The Collection: Beverley Knight is the second compilation album by English singer-songwriter Beverley Knight released via Parlophone on 20 July 2009 after Knight's departure from the record label.

The album comprises a mixture of previously released singles, some of which were not available on her Voice – The Best of Beverley Knight album, including her only other top 40 single "Rewind (Find a Way)". The Collection also contains three previously released B-sides, "Weekend Thing", "What If?" and "Special Kinda Cool", unavailable on any other Beverley Knight album. All songs were recorded throughout her eleven-year contract with Parlophone.

The versions of "After You" and "Shape of You" are the original album versions and not those released as singles.

Track listing

2009 compilation albums
Beverley Knight albums
Parlophone compilation albums